Shapeless Mountain is a  tall mountain standing west of the head of Balham Valley in Victoria Land in Antarctica. It was named in 1957 by the New Zealand Northern Survey Party of the Commonwealth Trans-Antarctic Expedition (1956–58) as being descriptive of its appearance from almost every direction.

Mountains of Victoria Land
Scott Coast